The 1990–91 Rugby League Divisional Premiership  was the 5th end-of-season Rugby League Divisional Premiership competition.

The competition was contested by the top eight teams in the second Division. The winners were Salford.

First round

Semi-finals

Replay

Final

See also
 1990–91 Rugby Football League season

Notes

References
 

Rugby League Divisional Premiership